Matti Nuutinen (born 6 May 1990) is a Finnish basketball player for Liberbank Oviedo Baloncesto of the Spanish LEB Oro. Since 2012, he plays for the Finnish national team.

Honours
Korisliiga: 2012, 2013

External links
Profile – Eurobasket.com

1990 births
Living people
Arkadikos B.C. players
Chorale Roanne Basket players
CSU Pitești players
Finnish expatriate basketball people in France
Finnish expatriate basketball people in Greece
Finnish expatriate basketball people in Spain
Finnish expatriate basketball people in Romania
Finnish men's basketball players
Kouvot players
Nilan Bisons players
Oviedo CB players
Power forwards (basketball)
Small forwards
Sportspeople from Turku
2014 FIBA Basketball World Cup players